
Year 861 (DCCCLXI) was a common year starting on Wednesday (link will display the full calendar) of the Julian calendar.

Events 
 By place 

 Europe 
 March – Robert the Strong is appointed margrave of Neustria by King Charles the Bald. He re-establishes the Breton March, and extends his remit by campaigning against Salomon, duke 'king' of Brittany. Robert hires a combined Seine-Loire fleet for 6,000 pounds of silver, 'before Salomon can ally with them against him'. In return, Salomon enlists 12 Viking ships under the command of Hastein, to raid the county of Maine, which, with Anjou, becomes squeezed between Brittany and Neustria.
 Spring – The Council of Constantinople, attended by 318 fathers and presided over by papal legates, confirms Photius the Great as patriarch, and passes 17 canons.
 Carloman, eldest son of King Louis the German, revolts against his father. He is captured, but manages to escape to the Ostmark (or 862).
 Summer – Viking raiders sack the cities of Paris, Cologne, Aachen, Worms and Toulouse.

 Abbasid Caliphate 

 December 11 – Caliph al-Mutawakkil is assassinated by his Turkish guard, starting the period of troubles known as the "Anarchy at Samarra" (861–870). He is succeeded by his son Al-Muntasir, as ruler of the Abbasid Caliphate.
 Ya'qub ibn al-Layth, a Muslim military leader, starts rebelling against the Abbasids and founds the Saffarid Dynasty in the 870s. He rules over parts of Khurasan and eastern Iran, and establishes his capital at Zaranj (modern Afghanistan).

 By topic 

 Hydrology 
 Al-Mutawakkil (r. 847–861) orders the construction of a Nilometer on Rhoda Island in central Cairo, supervised by the Persian astronomer Ahmad ibn Muhammad ibn Kathir al-Farghani.

Births 
 Abdullah ibn al-Mu'tazz, Muslim poet (d. 908)
 Abu Bakr Shibli, Muslim Sufi (d. 946)
 Al-Mu'tadid, Muslim caliph (or 854)
 Heongang, king of Silla (approximate date)

Deaths 
 Shuja also known as Umm Jaʽfar was the mother of Abbasid caliph Al-Mutawakkil.
 April 6 – Prudentius, bishop of Troyes 
 December 11
 Al-Mutawakkil, Abbasid caliph (b. 822), On the night of 11 December, about one hour after midnight, the Turk guards burst in the chamber where the Caliph and al-Fath were having supper. Al-Fath was killed trying to protect the Caliph, who was killed next. His son, Al-Muntasir, who now assumed the caliphate, initially claimed that al-Fath had murdered his father, and that he had been killed after; within a short time, however, the official story changed to al-Mutawakkil choking on his drink.
 al-Fath ibn Khaqan, chief confidante and councillor of al-Mutawakkil
 Ahmad ibn Muhammad ibn Kathir al-Farghani, Persian astronomer
 Álvaro of Córdoba, Mozarab scholar and theologian
 Ansovinus, bishop of Camerino (approximate date)
 Bai Minzhong, chancellor of the Tang Dynasty (b. 792)
 Gladilanus, Galician clergyman (approximate date)
 Gregory of Khandzta, Georgian archimandrite (b. 759)
 Heonan, king of Silla (Korea)
 Princess Ito of Japan
 Lando I, count of Capua
 Meinrad of Einsiedeln, German hermit and martyr
 Pribina, Slavic prince (approximate date)
 Samuel of Kakheti, Georgian prince

References

Sources